Talbot and Avoca was an electoral district of the Legislative Assembly in the Australian state of Victoria from 1889 to 1904. It was based in western Victoria around the towns of Talbot  and Avoca. The Electoral district of Avoca was abolished in March 1889 and Talbot and Avoca created in April 1889.

Members

      # =by-election

References

Former electoral districts of Victoria (Australia)
1889 establishments in Australia
1904 disestablishments in Australia